The Honda DN-01 is a cruiser motorcycle made by Honda from 2008 to 2010. It was introduced at the 2005 Tokyo Motor Show and went on sale in Japan and Europe in 2008, in the United States in 2009, and was discontinued at the end of 2010. 

The Honda DN-01 is one of a small number of motorcycles offered by a major motorcycle manufacturer with an automatic transmission, the others being the Hondas VFR1200F, CTX700, NC700/750, Africa Twin, 2018 Goldwing, and NM4; Yamaha FJR1300AE; and the Aprilia Mana 850.

About
The DN-01 is noted for its automatic continuously variable transmission (CVT) technology, marketed by Honda as the "Human Friendly Transmission."

Reviewer complaints focused on ergonomics, especially potentially uncomfortable seating on long rides, and the lack of wind protection at high speed, meaning the rider is fatigued pulling on the handlebars to resist the wind pushing him backwards. There is also no storage space at all, and the price of US$14,599 was much higher than any comparably performing machine. Since the initial reviews, the price rose to US$15,599. The load capacity is only , meaning that with a passenger the DN-01 is likely to become overloaded if touring were attempted. Ultimate MotorCycling, like other reviewers, was fascinated with the transmission technology but found the combination of styles and features unsatisfactory from the point of view of either a cruiser rider or sportbike rider, while the lack of storage fails to meet the needs of either touring riders or the urban commuter scooter buyer.

The DN-01 has a catalyst system compliant with EURO-3, California Air Resources Board (CARB) and EPA emissions standards.

Transmission

The DN-01 uses a continuously variable transmission, marketed by Honda as the Human Friendly Transmission, allowing either manual selection of a "gear" or automatic operation much like a CVT scooter, with continuously variable transmission ratios selected automatically by the system's controller for optimal performance.

See also
 Swashplate engine

Notes

References

External links

 Honda DN-01 official page
 Illustration of Human Friendly Drive operation in Popular Science

DN-01
Cruiser motorcycles
Motorcycles introduced in 2005